Tiberiu Andrei Serediuc (born 2 July 1992) is a Romanian footballer who plays as a midfielder.

International career

Serediuc made his debut for Romania U-19 on 26 September 2008 in a game against Israel U-19. He played with the under-19 team at the 2011 UEFA European Under-19 Football Championship, which took place in Romania.

References

External links
 
 
 
 
 

Sportspeople from Suceava
1992 births
Living people
Romanian footballers
Association football midfielders
Liga I players
Liga II players
CSM Jiul Petroșani players
CS Otopeni players
CS Concordia Chiajna players
FC Botoșani players
FC Hermannstadt players
AFC Turris-Oltul Turnu Măgurele players
FC Politehnica Iași (2010) players
Romania youth international footballers
Romania under-21 international footballers